Aaron Michael Nola (born June 4, 1993) is an American professional baseball pitcher for the Philadelphia Phillies of Major League Baseball (MLB).

Nola was born in Baton Rouge, Louisiana, and played baseball alongside his older brother Austin. His father A. J. served as Nola's Little League coach until high school. After struggling his freshman season due to stress fractures in his back, Nola spent three years playing varsity baseball for Catholic High School in Baton Rouge, including two state playoff appearances. At the end of his senior year in 2011, the Louisiana Sports Writers Association named Nola the state's "Mr. Baseball".

Drafted by the Toronto Blue Jays in 2011, he instead attended Louisiana State University (LSU), where he was roommates with future MLB infielder Alex Bregman. In his three seasons as a weekend starter with the LSU Tigers, Nola was twice named the SEC Pitcher of the Year, and won the National Pitcher of the Year Award in 2014. He also played collegiate summer baseball with the Harwich Mariners of the Cape Cod Baseball League.

The Phillies selected Nola seventh overall in the 2014 MLB Draft, and he signed with the team that June. He advanced through the Phillies' farm system throughout the 2014 and 2015 seasons, becoming the first Phillies pitcher to make his major league debut the season after his draft since Pat Combs in 1989. Although Nola performed well in his first full season with the Phillies in 2016, he was shut down early due to an elbow injury. He returned in 2017 to beat Curt Schilling's 1996 record for most strikeouts by a Phillies pitcher with fewer than 30 starts in one season. The following year, he became the fourth pitcher in franchise history to record at least 200 strikeouts in a single season. Nola has started every Opening Day game for the Phillies since 2018, and is considered the team's ace.

Early life
Nola was born on June 4, 1993, in Baton Rouge, Louisiana, the son of A.J. and Stacie Nola. His maternal grandfather, Richard Barrios, served as sergeant at arms for the Louisiana House of Representatives. Although Nola started playing baseball at the age of nine, his passion for the sport only began when he watched his older brother Austin Nola play in tournaments. As a child, Nola used to mimick a pitching motion while watching himself in the mirror, a gesture that his father described as "strange gyrations".

Nola's father served as his Little League Baseball coach until high school, when he began playing for Catholic High School in Baton Rouge. Stress fractures in his back, which doctors attributed to a six-inch summer growth spurt, hampered Nola's freshman season. Nola spent three seasons on the varsity team, including two state playoff appearances. He missed one month of his junior season with a hernia, but returned in the playoffs to pitch Catholic to the state finals. In his senior year, the Louisiana Sports Writers Association named Nola "Mr. Baseball", given to the top player in the state. Across his varsity baseball career, Nola posted a 21–2 win–loss record and 214 strikeouts in 152 innings pitched.

College career
Both Aaron and Austin Nola were selected by the Toronto Blue Jays of Major League Baseball (MLB) in the 2011 MLB Draft. Aaron elected not to sign with the Blue Jays, and instead attended Louisiana State University (LSU), where his brother was a senior. Nola majored in Sports Management at LSU, and was roommates with Alex Bregman. After throwing 78 pitches in a 5–0 shutout game against Tulane, Nola gave up five runs in the first inning in his Southeastern Conference (SEC) debut against Mississippi State. He quickly rebounded, and posted five shutout innings, a recovery that struck LSU pitching coach Alan Dunn, who said that the turnaround "gave us a glimpse of how good Aaron could be". Head coach Paul Mainieri "made a commitment that day that [Nola] was going to be a starter on the weekend", a position that would have him pitch largely in conference games.

Nola finished his freshman season in 2012 with a 7–4 record and a 3.61 earned run average (ERA) in  innings, as well as with seven walks and 89 strikeouts. In the postseason, he was the starting pitcher in the first game of the best-of-three 2012 Baton Rouge Super Regional. It would be the only game that LSU would win against the Stony Brook Seawolves in that tournament. That summer, he played collegiate summer baseball with the Harwich Mariners of the Cape Cod Baseball League, with whom he recorded a 2–0 record and 0.82 ERA in 11 innings.

Nola impressed in his second season with LSU. On April 19, he threw his first career shutout complete game against Alabama, becoming the first LSU pitcher to shutout an SEC team since Kevin Gausman in 2011. On May 3 against Florida, Nola became the first LSU pitcher to record four consecutive complete game victories since Mike Sirotka in 1993, and the first two record two shutouts in one season since Greg Smith in 2005. That year, Nola went 12–1 with a 1.57 ERA in 126 innings pitched. He also recorded a 0.82 walks plus hits per inning pitched (WHIP) measure. He was also named to the National Collegiate Baseball Writers Association (NCBWA), Baseball America, and Collegiate Baseball All-American teams, and was named the SEC Pitcher of the Year. Nola was a finalist for the National Pitcher of the Year Award, and was the recipient of the 2012–13 Corbett Award, given to the best amateur athlete in the state of Louisiana.

Prior to the 2014 season, Nola and Bregman were named first-team preseason All-Americans by the NCBWA. That year, he pitched to an 11–1 record with a 1.47 ERA, 27 walks, 134 strikeouts, and a .172 opponent batting average in  innings. He once again won the SEC Player of the Year Award, and was the recipient of the 2014 National Pitcher of the Year award. He was also a finalist for the Golden Spikes Award, given to the best amateur baseball player in the US, and the Dick Howser Trophy, awarded to the best national college baseball player of the year. Across his three-year career at LSU, Nola posted a 30–6 record and 2.09 ERA in 332 innings, with 42 walks and 345 strikeouts. He ranks third in LSU history for strikeouts, fourth for ERA, and fifth for pitching wins.

Professional career

Minor leagues
The Philadelphia Phillies selected Nola in the first round, seventh overall, of the 2014 MLB Draft. He signed with the team for a $3.3 million signing bonus on June 10, 2014, and was assigned to the Phillies' Class A-Advanced minor league affiliate, the Clearwater Threshers. In his first five starts with the Threshers, Nola posted a 3.80 ERA and 18 strikeouts in  innings pitched. That season with Clearwater, he posted a 2–3 record, with a 3.16 ERA and 30 strikeouts in  innings pitched. He was then promoted to the Double-A Reading Phillies, making his debut on August 6, 2014, against the Harrisburg Senators. He threw 72 pitches, including 47 strikes, in five innings for the Phillies, who won 9–2. Nola closed out the season in Reading with a 2–0 record and 2.63 ERA in 24 innings pitched.

Nola began the 2015 season with Reading, going 7–3 in 12 starts with a 1.88 ERA and 0.89 WHIP. He was promoted to the Triple-A Lehigh Valley IronPigs on June 14, 2015. In his debut on June 18, Nola threw five shutout innings in a 3–0 win over the Buffalo Bisons. Nola went 3–1 with a 3.58 ERA and 1.44 WHIP in six starts with the IronPigs. He was selected for the 2015 MLB All-Star Futures Game, but did not pitch. His last game before being called up to the majors was also his worst professional start, giving up six runs in three innings to the Rochester Red Wings.

Philadelphia Phillies

2015–16

Nola made his major league debut on July 21, 2015, the first Phillies pitcher to debut the season after he was drafted since Pat Combs in 1989. He wore No. 27 for the Phillies, as his college jersey number 10 was used by coach Larry Bowa. He threw his first major league strikeout to Steven Souza Jr. in the first inning of the 1–0 loss against the Tampa Bay Rays. That one run was a solo home run, and the first career hit, from opposing pitcher Nathan Karns. He notched his first win less than a week later, pitching  innings and earning a run batted in (RBI) in the Phillies' July 25, 11–5 rout of the Chicago Cubs. Nola finished the season with a 6–2 record and 3.59 ERA in 13 starts and  innings pitched. The Phillies shut Nola down on September 27, in accordance with a decision made that July to end his season after pitching approximately 185 innings between the majors and minors.

On April 2, 2016, Nola was named to the Phillies' 2016 Opening Day roster. Although he managed a 5–4 record and 2.65 ERA in his first 12 starts, he soon struggled, posting a 9.82 ERA in eight starts between June 11 and July 28, and took a two-week break in July to focus on his physical and mental health. On August 3, the Phillies announced that Nola would go on the 15-day disabled list with a right elbow strain. Two weeks later, general manager Matt Klentak announced that Nola had been diagnosed with "low-grade" sprains and strains in his elbow, and that he would not pitch again for the remainder of the season. He pitched 111 innings that season in 20 starts and posted a 6–9 record and 4.78 ERA.

2017–18

Going into 2017 spring training, Nola declared himself "100 percent", and he was named to the 25-man roster on April 2. He made a strong return to the mound, allowing two runs or fewer in 18 of his 27-season starts. Recording 184 strikeouts in 27 starts, Nola beat Curt Schilling's 1996 record for most strikeouts by a Phillies pitcher with fewer than 30 starts in one season. In April, he was briefly placed on the disabled list with a lower back strain. He finished the season with a 12–11 record, 3.54 ERA, and 184 strikeouts in 27 starts and 168 innings.

Nola was chosen as the Phillies' Opening Day starting pitcher in 2018. Manager Gabe Kapler's decision to remove Nola from the mound after only 68 pitches was subject to controversy, as the relief pitchers during that game gave up eight runs to the Atlanta Braves. On May 8, 2018, Nola struck out a career-high 12 batters in seven innings against the San Francisco Giants. He was named to the 2018 National League All Star team after posting an 11–2 record and 2.41 ERA in his first 18 starts of the season. Nola finished the season with a 17–6 record and 2.37 ERA in 33 starts and  innings. He was the second Phillie, after Grover Cleveland Alexander, to strike out over 200 batters and hold his opponents to a batting average of .200 or lower in a single season, and held the fourth-highest single-season strikeout record in Phillies history, behind Alexander, Schilling, and Jim Bunning. Nola came in third in voting for the 2018 National League Cy Young Award, behind Jacob deGrom of the New York Mets and Max Scherzer of the Washington Nationals.

2019–20

During the offseason, on February 13, 2019, Nola signed a four-year, $45 million contract extension with the Phillies, including a $2 million signing bonus. He was once again named the Opening Day starter, throwing six innings in the team's 10–4 win over the Braves. He posted a 12–7 record for the season, pitching to a 3.87 ERA and 229 strikeouts in 34 starts and  innings.

Nola arrived late to the Phillies' 2020 spring training after quarantining due to exposure to COVID-19. He made his third consecutive Opening Day start in 2020, starting in a 5–2 loss against the Miami Marlins. He pitched his first two complete games with the Phillies in 2020, both of which were only seven innings due to a rule that shortened doubleheaders. His August 26 start against the Nationals on Matt Breen served as Joe Girardi's 1000th managerial win. In the pandemic-shortened 2020 season, he posted a 5–5 record and 3.28 ERA in 12 starts and  innings. Nola's 5–0 loss to the Rays at the end of the regular season eliminated the Phillies from wild card contention in the postseason.

2021
Nola was selected to pitching Opening Day for the fourth year in a row in 2021, the longest streak by a Phillies pitcher since Steve Carlton opened ten seasons in a row between 1977 and 1986. On April 18, 2021, Nola threw his first complete game shutout in the MLB, beating the St. Louis Cardinals 2–0. Less than two months later, on June 1, Nola recorded his 1,000th career strikeout. He was the fastest Phillies pitcher to reach that number, doing so in 913 innings, and joined Cole Hamels and Steve Carlton as the only Phillies pitchers to record 1,000 or more strikeouts before the age of 28. On June 25, Nola struck out 10 consecutive batters in a game against the Mets, tying Tom Seaver's April 22, 1970, record for most consecutive strikeouts in a game. 

For the 2021 season, he had the lowest LOB percentage in the majors among pitchers, at 66.8%. Nola finished the 2021 season with a 9–9 record, pitching to a 4.63 ERA and 223 strikeouts in 32 starts and  innings.

2022

Due to an injury to Zack Wheeler, who had seemingly supplanted Nola as the team's ace, Nola was called upon to make his fifth consecutive opening day start pitching 6 innings and getting the win over the Oakland Athletics. On August 13, Nola pitched a complete game but took the loss in a pitcher's duel with Jacob deGrom 1–0. On October 3, 2022, Nola started the Phillies' playoff-clinching win over the Houston Astros, carrying a perfect game through  innings. 

Nola finished the 2022 season with a 11–13 record, posting a 3.25 ERA and 235 strikeouts in 32 starts and 205 innings. Nola also lead the Majors in strikeout-to-walk ratio. Five days after the Phillies clinched in Houston, Nola threw  shutout innings against the St. Louis Cardinals in Game 2 of the 2022 National League Wild Card Series as the Phillies won the series 2–0. On October 14, Nola started Game 3 of the 2022 National League Division Series, the first Phillies home playoff game in eleven years. He allowed one unearned run and five hits over six innings. Nola started Game 2 of the 2022 National League Championship Series, as well, against the San Diego Padres. During the game, Aaron and Austin Nola became the first pair of brothers in Major League Baseball postseason history to face each other as pitcher and batter.

During the 2022 World Series, Nola was the starting pitcher for Phillies in Game 1 and Game 4. Nola got a no-decision for Game 1 due to the fact though he only pitched for 5 innings and gave up 5 runs, including a pair of home runs to Kyle Tucker, Phillies tied the game and won in the 10th inning due to J. T. Realmuto's game-winning home run. But in Game 4, Nola gave up no runs throughout 4 innings, but loaded the bases in the 5th inning and was lifted, and afterward left-handed relief pitcher Jose Alvarado's poor outing resulted in Astros' scoring 5 runs during the inning, and Nola ended up being the losing pitcher in Game 4, a turning point in World Series, which Phillies eventually lost in 6 games. 

On Nov 7, 2022, Phillies exercised their end of the $16 million club option on Aaron Nola for 2023, and it is expected Phillies will retain Nola for at least another season.

Pitching style
Early in his career, Nola was labeled the Phillies' ace, with his pitching record drawing favorable comparisons to former club standouts Cole Hamels, Cliff Lee, Roy Halladay, and Roy Oswalt. In 2020, Nola and his teammate Zack Wheeler tied for 11th among major league pitchers, recording 2.0 Wins Above Replacement (WAR) that season. Going into the 2021 season, Mike DePrisco of NBC Sports ranked Nola sixth among all 30 Opening Day pitchers, while Will Leitch of MLB.com placed him at number 10. As of May 2020, Nola averaged 9.63 strikeouts per nine innings, the highest in franchise history.

Nola has largely maintained the same four-pitch lineup since entering the majors in 2015, throwing a four-seam fastball, a curveball, a changeup, and a sinker. He began working a cutter into his rotation during 2021 spring training, saying, "I've always wanted to throw one but never took it into a game."

Nola has consistently struggled during the month of September. Between 2018 and 2020, his pre-September statistics showed a 30–9 record and 2.79 ERA in 62 starts, while in September over the same time period, he pitched 4–9 with a 4.44 ERA in 17 starts. During the 2019 season, Nola went 0–3 in September, with a 6.51 ERA in five starts. Former manager Joe Girardi and Nola are aware of Nola's late-season struggles, but are unsure of why they occur.

Personal life
Nola is of Italian descent on his father's side; his great-grandparents emigrated to Baton Rouge from Sicily. His older brother Austin currently catches for the San Diego Padres. Their uncle suffers from amyotrophic lateral sclerosis (ALS), and in January 2020, the Nola brothers hosted a "Strike Out ALS" charity event on his behalf.

During the COVID-19 pandemic, Nola partnered with Pennsylvania brewing company Yuengling to launch "Cheers PA", an initiative to provide aid for restaurant and bar workers impacted by shutdowns. He and catcher J. T. Realmuto also serve as the Phillies ambassadors for Garth Brooks' "Home Plate Project", which raises money to fight childhood hunger in the US and Canada. The Phillies nominated Nola for the 2020 Roberto Clemente Award for his charity work.

Nola is an evangelical Christian. His walk-up song is "I am Second" by Christian rock band Newsboys.

See also
2013 College Baseball All-America Team
List of Major League Baseball individual streaks

References

External links

LSU Tigers bio

1993 births
Living people
Baseball players from Baton Rouge, Louisiana
Catholic High School (Baton Rouge, Louisiana) alumni
All-American college baseball players
Major League Baseball pitchers
Philadelphia Phillies players
LSU Tigers baseball players
Harwich Mariners players
Clearwater Threshers players
Reading Fightin Phils players
Lehigh Valley IronPigs players
American people of Italian descent
Christians from Louisiana